Jan Blatný (born 24 March 1970) is a Czech physician, teacher and politician. On 29 October 2020 he was named as Minister of Health of the Czech Republic by Prime Minister Andrej Babiš following the resignation of Roman Prymula. On 7 April 2021 he was replaced by Petr Arenberger.

References

people from Prostějov
1970 births
Health ministers of the Czech Republic
ANO 2011 Government ministers
Living people
COVID-19 pandemic in the Czech Republic
Czech physicians
Hematologists
Masaryk University alumni